Jonathan Schmid (born 22 June 1990) is a French professional footballer who plays as a midfielder or right back for Bundesliga club SC Freiburg.

Early and personal life
Schmid was born in 1990 in Strasbourg to an Austrian father who comes from Gresten in the District of Scheibbs in Lower Austria, and an Alsatian mother He is of Algerian descent through his maternal grandfather. He grew up in the troubled neighbourhood of Neuhof. His brother Anthony Schmid is also a professional footballer in Austria.

Career

Early career
In 1994, he started in the youth academy of Racing Strasbourg. In 2006, he left the club and played for Sporting Schiltigheim and Mars Bischheim. Strasbourg is situated on the border with Germany; on the recommendation of a friend, he went into the youth of the German amateur side Offenburger FV. In a game in the A-youth-Bundesliga against SC Freiburg, he was the coach of the Freiburg side, Christian Streich, on and convinced him with his performance.
Finally to the 2008–09 season, he joined the youth academy of SC Freiburg and won in his first season, the DFB-Pokal in the A-youth.

Hoffenheim 
In June 2015, Schmid signed a four-year contract with 1899 Hoffenheim, as part of a deal that saw Vincenzo Grifo join SC Freiburg.

Augsburg 
In August 2016 Schmid joined FC Augsburg on a four-year-contract.

Return to Freiburg
On 31 May 2019, FC Augsburg announced, that Schmid would return to SC Freiburg for the upcoming season.

Career statistics

References 

1990 births
Living people
Footballers from Strasbourg
French footballers
French people of Austrian descent
French sportspeople of Algerian descent
Association football midfielders
Offenburger FV players
SC Freiburg players
SC Freiburg II players
TSG 1899 Hoffenheim players
FC Augsburg players
Bundesliga players
Regionalliga players
French expatriate footballers
Expatriate footballers in Germany
French expatriate sportspeople in Germany